Appapuram may refer to:

 Appapuram, Kakumanu mandal, a village in Andhra Pradesh, India
 Appapuram, Nadendla mandal, a village in Andhra Pradesh, India